Tamás Szélpál (born 11 July 1987) is a Hungarian football player who currently plays for Békéscsaba 1912 Előre SE.

External links
 Profile 

1987 births
Living people
Sportspeople from Szeged
Hungarian footballers
Association football midfielders
Szeged LC footballers
Makó FC footballers
Tisza Volán SC footballers
Diósgyőri VTK players
Debreceni VSC players
Nyíregyháza Spartacus FC players
Szolnoki MÁV FC footballers
Békéscsaba 1912 Előre footballers